Chone may refer to:
Casabona, Italy, previously the Ancient Greek city of Chone, Magna Graecia
Chone, Ecuador, an Ecuadorian city located in the Manabí Province
Chone Canton, Ecuador, whose capital is Chone
Chone Figgins (born 1978), a Major League Baseball utility player
Chone Monastery, in Jonê County, Gansu, China
Jonê County,  Chone County, Gansu, China
 Chone (polychaete), a genus of polychaetes in the family Sabellidae